Springfield is an unincorporated community in Lynn Township, Posey County, in the U.S. state of Indiana.

History
Springfield was platted in 1817. The community served from its beginning until 1825 as the county seat, but when the seat was transferred to Mount Vernon in 1825, business activity shifted elsewhere, and the town's population dwindled. A post office was established at Springfield in 1818, and remained in operation until 1828.

Geography

References

Unincorporated communities in Posey County, Indiana
Unincorporated communities in Indiana
Former county seats in Indiana